Adam Joseph Arthur (born 27 October 1985) is an English footballer who plays for West Virginia Chaos in the USL Premier Development League.

Career
Arthur played for York City and Ossett Town. He played two games for York as a trainee in their final season in Football League Two prior to their relegation to the Football Conference, before moving to Ossett in the Northern Premier League.

Arthur moved to the United States in 2007 to play college soccer at perennial top 15 program Lander University, where he was an NSCAA Division II All-American. During his college years he also played for two seasons with West Virginia Chaos in the USL Premier Development League.

Following the conclusion of his college career, Arthur returned to the UK, playing for Selby Town in the Northern Counties East Football League in the 2010–11 season. He returned to the United States in 2011, again playing for West Virginia Chaos.

References

External links

1985 births
Living people
Footballers from Nottingham
English footballers
Association football midfielders
York City F.C. players
Ossett Town F.C. players
West Virginia Chaos players
English Football League players
National League (English football) players
USL League Two players
English expatriate sportspeople in the United States
Expatriate soccer players in the United States
English expatriate footballers